The Teatro Diego Fabbri (Diego Fabbri Theatre) is a theatre in Forlì, Emilia-Romagna, northern Italy. It was opened in September 2000 and is managed by the municipality of Forlì.

It is provided with 550 seats in the arena and 160 in the galleries, a foyer with 100 seats and two rehearsal halls.

External links
Official website

Buildings and structures in Forlì
Performing arts venues in Emilia-Romagna
Theatres in Emilia-Romagna